This was a new event on the ITF Women's Circuit.

Veronika Kudermetova and Aleksandra Pospelova won the inaugural title, defeating Jacqueline Cako and Sabina Sharipova in the final, 6–2, 6–4.

Seeds

Draw

References 
 Draw

Bank of Liuzhou Cup - Doubles